Kegeliella is a genus of orchids native to Mesoamerica, Trinidad, and northern South America.

Species
 Kegeliella atropilosa - Veracruz to Panama
 Kegeliella houtteana - Trinidad, Venezuela, Suriname, French Guiana, Amapá
 Kegeliella kupperi - Costa Rica, Panama, Colombia, Venezuela
 Kegeliella orientalis - Venezuela

References

External links

Stanhopeinae genera
Stanhopeinae